Amika Shail (pronounced [a-mee-kaa]; born 12 November) is an Indian singer turned actress. She is known for her works in Hindi-language cinema, web series, web films, and television. She portrayed the character of Vayu Pari in Balveer Returns.

Early life 

Amika Shail was born in Uttarpara in the Hooghly district of West Bengal and currently lives in Mumbai. Amika started her career on the silver screen as a contestant on Sa Re Ga Ma Pa Lil Champs singing reality show at the age of 9.

Amika started learning music at the age of 5 years from her mother. Amika has also participated in Bengali version of "Sa Re Ga Ma Pa". She later participated in other singing reality shows like - Sa Re Ga Ma Pa National Talent Hunt, Indian Idol, Star Voice of India and All India Radio Show.

The actress is a post graduate in Hindustani Classical Music passed out as a Sangeet Visharad.  Amika has lent her voice to the television commercials of brands such as Dabur, Colgate, Santoor, Ujala and IPL.

The actress in a candid interview had admitted that she had taken up the job as a music teacher during her early struggling days in Mumbai to make ends meet. The actress considers A.R. Rahman as her music inspiration. She considers Priyanka Chopra to be her acting inspiration.

Acting Breakthrough 
Amika got a career breakthrough when she started acting on television starting with ‘Udaan’. Later, she then went on to act in television soaps like ‘Divya Drishti’, ‘Balveer Returns’, etc.

Amika has also been a part of television series like ‘Madam Sir’, ‘Laal Ishq’, ‘Shaadi ke Siyape’ ‘Gunah’ and ‘Abhay’. 

Amika in an interview mentioned that "After being a singer, I realized that I could try my hand at acting. I was very fascinated by the television industry right from the time I participated in singing reality shows. I admit that I came to Mumbai with the goal of being a singer, but acting drew me towards itself. ‘Udaan’ boosted my confidence and motivated me to go for more."

Amika currently is the Indian Brand Ambassador for the South African Brand ESN also known as Evolution Sports Nutrition. The global brand endorser is the star Cricketer Jonty Rhodes. The actress is a fitness freak and considers Milkha Singh as her fitness inspiration.

Post the COVID-19 induced lockdown in the country, the actress is doing only web shows for various OTT platforms and taken a break from TV for sometime.

Filmography

Television

Web

Songs

Reality Shows

Media 

Amika is very active on social media platforms including Instagram, Twitter, Facebook and YouTube page. The actress is one of the top 10 most followed Indian Cover Singers on YouTube. The social media photoshoots that the actress does often become a talking point in the media.

The actress also represented India at the World Youth Forum in Egypt for the second time in 2022. She sang and performed on a song in front of Global audience which included the President of Egypt. She was also felicitated at the Egyptian Embassy in India for the same.

See also 
 List of Indian television actresses
 List of Indian film actresses
 List of people from West Bengal

References

External links 
 
 
 

Living people
21st-century Indian actresses
Actresses in Hindi cinema
Female models from Mumbai
Indian film actresses
Indian television actresses
Actresses from Mumbai
Indian women playback singers
Indian women pop singers
Indian voice actresses
Women musicians from West Bengal
Indian Hindus
Year of birth missing (living people)